Sør-Trøndelag Police District in Norway was created in 2002 when the former Trondheim Police District and Uttrøndelag Police District were merged.

 
The district covers 23 municipalities, including the cities of Trondheim (Sentrum and Heimdal Police Stations) and Røros and 17 sheriff's offices (lensmannskontor) and two police stations, city center and Heimdal. Management, Incident, Prosecution Section and main police jail is added to the central Sentrum Police Station in Trondheim. The district serves about. 260 000 inhabitants with its approx. 520 employees, of which 400 police officers.
The easiest way to contact the police in Sør-Trøndelag is by telephone, emergency ☎ 112, non-emergency calls at ☎ 02800 or ☎ (+47)73 89 90 90.

See also 
Norwegian Police Service

References

Police districts in Norway
Organisations based in Trondheim